The Minister of Finance and Economic Affairs is a minister in the Cabinet of the Gambia who is responsible for the financial management of government affairs, drawing up the budget, and developing economic policy.

History 
In 1985, Minister of Finance Saikouba Sisay designed and implemented an Economic Recovery Programme. In 1992, a review of the Directorate of Customs commissioned by the Gambian government and performed by HM Customs and Excise found that the Gambian Minister of Finance granted duty waivers without sufficient acceptance guidelines, proper monitoring, or control of imports. In 1994, Minister of Finance Bakary B. Dabo was dismissed from the position because of his alleged involvement in the failed coup attempt of November 11.

Ministers of Finance and Economic Affairs

Sheriff S. Sisay, 1962-1967
Sheriff Dibba, 1967-1972
Ibrahima Muhammadou Garba-Jahumpa, 1972-1977
Lamin Bora M’Boge, 1977
Assan Musa Camara, 1977-1978
Momodou Cadija Cham, 1978-1981
Saihou S. Sabally, 1981-1982
Sheriff S. Sisay, 1982-1989
Saihou S. Sabally, 1989-1992
Bakary Bunja Dabo, 1992-1994

Source:

References

Lists of government ministers of the Gambia